Beckett is a pit-floored crater on Mercury, which was discovered in January 2008 during the first flyby of the planet by the MESSENGER spacecraft. The crater was named in November 2008 by the IAU.

Its floor is not smooth and displays a telephone or arc-shaped collapse feature, which is also called a central pit. Such a feature may have resulted from the collapse of a magma chamber underlying the central part of the crater (see also Gibran and Picasso). The collapse feature is an analog of Earth's volcanic calderas.

References

Impact craters on Mercury